The Kawasaki KR750 was a racing motorcycle built by Kawasaki. It featured a liquid-cooled, three-cylinder, two-stroke engine. In 1975, the first version (type 602) was approved by the AMA and in 1976 it was improved by fitting new brakes and forks. The update of this bike (type 602L) was introduced in 1977.

References

External links
 http://www.ozebook.com/h2r.htm

Grand Prix motorcycles
KR750
Two-stroke motorcycles
Motorcycles introduced in 1975